Planetary oceanography also called astro-oceanography or exo-oceanography is the study of oceans on planets and moons other than Earth. Unlike other planetary sciences like astrobiology, astrochemistry and planetary geology, it only began after the discovery of underground oceans in Saturn's moon Titan and Jupiter's moon Europa. This field remains speculative until further missions reach the oceans beneath the rock or ice layer of the moons. There are many theories about oceans or even ocean worlds of celestial bodies in the Solar System, from oceans made of diamond in Neptune to a gigantic ocean of liquid hydrogen that may exist underneath Jupiter's surface.

Early in their geologic histories, Mars and Venus are theorized to have had large water oceans. The Mars ocean hypothesis suggests that nearly a third of the surface of Mars was once covered by water, and a runaway greenhouse effect may have boiled away the global ocean of Venus. Compounds such as salts and ammonia dissolved in water lower its freezing point so that water might exist in large quantities in extraterrestrial environments as brine or convecting ice. Unconfirmed oceans are speculated beneath the surface of many dwarf planets and natural satellites; notably, the ocean of the moon Europa is estimated to have over twice the water volume of Earth's. The Solar System's giant planets are also thought to have liquid atmospheric layers of yet to be confirmed compositions. Oceans may also exist on exoplanets and exomoons, including surface oceans of liquid water within a circumstellar habitable zone. Ocean planets are a hypothetical type of planet with a surface completely covered with liquid.

Planetary oceanography is closely related to Astrobiology, as oceans are expected to have higher chances to house simple forms of life.

Extraterrestrial water oceans

Planets 

The gas giants, Jupiter and Saturn, are thought to lack surfaces and instead have a stratum of liquid hydrogen; however their planetary geology is not well understood. The possibility of the ice giants Uranus and Neptune having hot, highly compressed, supercritical water under their thick atmospheres has been hypothesised. Although their composition is still not fully understood, a 2006 study by Wiktorowicz and Ingersall ruled out the possibility of such a water "ocean" existing on Neptune, though some studies have suggested that exotic oceans of liquid diamond are possible.

The Mars ocean hypothesis suggests that nearly a third of the surface of Mars was once covered by water, though the water on Mars is no longer oceanic (much of it residing in the ice caps). The possibility continues to be studied along with reasons for their apparent disappearance. Astronomers now think that Venus may have had liquid water and perhaps oceans for over 2 billion years.

Natural satellites 

A global layer of liquid water thick enough to decouple the crust from the mantle is thought to be present on the natural satellites Titan, Europa, Enceladus and, with less certainty, Callisto, Ganymede and Triton. A magma ocean is thought to be present on Io. Geysers or fumaroles have been found on Saturn's moon Enceladus, possibly originating from an ocean about  beneath the surface ice shell. Other icy moons may also have internal oceans, or may once have had internal oceans that have now frozen.

Large bodies of liquid hydrocarbons are thought to be present on the surface of Titan, although they are not large enough to be considered oceans and are sometimes referred to as lakes or seas. The Cassini–Huygens space mission initially discovered only what appeared to be dry lakebeds and empty river channels, suggesting that Titan had lost what surface liquids it might have had. Later flybys of Titan provided radar and infrared images that showed a series of hydrocarbon lakes in the colder polar regions. Titan is thought to have a subsurface liquid-water ocean under the ice in addition to the hydrocarbon mix that forms atop its outer crust.

Dwarf planets and trans-Neptunian objects 

Ceres appears to be differentiated into a rocky core and icy mantle and may harbour a liquid-water ocean under its surface.

In June 2020, astronomers reported evidence that the dwarf planet Pluto may have had a subsurface ocean, and consequently may have been habitable, when it was first formed.

Extrasolar 

Some planets and natural satellites outside the Solar System are likely to have oceans, including possible water ocean planets similar to Earth in the habitable zone or "liquid-water belt". The detection of oceans, even through the spectroscopy method, however is likely extremely difficult and inconclusive.

Theoretical models have been used to predict with high probability that GJ 1214 b, detected by transit, is composed of exotic form of ice VII, making up 75% of its mass,
making it an ocean planet.

Other possible candidates are merely speculative based on their mass and position in the habitable zone include planet though little is actually known of their composition. Some scientists speculate Kepler-22b may be an "ocean-like" planet. Models have been proposed for Gliese 581 d that could include surface oceans. Gliese 436 b is speculated to have an ocean of "hot ice". Exomoons orbiting planets, particularly gas giants within their parent star's habitable zone may theoretically have surface oceans.

Terrestrial planets will acquire water during their accretion, some of which will be buried in the magma ocean but most of it will go into a steam atmosphere, and when the atmosphere cools it will collapse on to the surface forming an ocean. There will also be outgassing of water from the mantle as the magma solidifies—this will happen even for planets with a low percentage of their mass composed of water, so "super-Earth exoplanets may be expected to commonly produce water oceans within tens to hundreds of millions of years of their last major accretionary impact."

Non-water surface liquids 

Oceans, seas, lakes and other bodies of liquids can be composed of liquids other than water, for example the hydrocarbon lakes on Titan. The possibility of seas of nitrogen on Triton was also considered but ruled out. There is evidence that the icy surfaces of the moons Ganymede, Callisto, Europa, Titan and Enceladus are shells floating on oceans of very dense liquid water or water–ammonia solution. 

Extrasolar terrestrial planets that are extremely close to their parent star will be tidally locked and so one half of the planet will be a magma ocean.  It is also possible that terrestrial planets had magma oceans at some point during their formation as a result of giant impacts.  Hot Neptunes close to their star could lose their atmospheres via hydrodynamic escape, leaving behind their cores with various liquids on the surface. Where there are suitable temperatures and pressures, volatile chemicals that might exist as liquids in abundant quantities on planets include ammonia, argon, carbon disulfide, ethane, hydrazine, hydrogen, hydrogen cyanide, hydrogen sulfide, methane, neon, nitrogen, nitric oxide, phosphine, silane, sulfuric acid, and water.

Supercritical fluids, although not liquids, do share various properties with liquids.  Underneath the thick atmospheres of the planets Uranus and Neptune, it is expected that these planets are composed of oceans of hot high-density fluid mixtures of water, ammonia and other volatiles. The gaseous outer layers of Jupiter and Saturn transition smoothly into oceans of supercritical hydrogen. The atmosphere of Venus is 96.5% carbon dioxide, which is a supercritical fluid at its surface.

See also 

 Extraterrestrial liquid water 
 List of largest lakes and seas in the Solar System

References 

Space science
Oceanography